Steve Gottlieb is the name of:

 Steve Gottlieb (amateur astronomer)
 Steve Gottlieb (music executive)